The Collection 1977–1982 is a compilation album by The Stranglers. It was released to complete their contract with EMI, who had acquired the band's back catalogue on the United Artists and Liberty labels.  It peaked at No. 12 in the UK Albums Chart in 1982.

The album collected together several of the band's most popular singles and album tracks, and also included a "new" track, "Strange Little Girl". The inclusion of "Strange Little Girl" was an ironic move on the band's part: EMI had been indifferent to the band when they acquired their catalogue the previous year, not regarding them as a commercial proposition. The band proved them wrong by having a hit single with "Golden Brown", despite lacklustre promotion from EMI. When required to deliver a final single, the band re-recorded the song "Strange Little Girl", which had originally been on a demo tape they had given to EMI in 1974. EMI rejected the tape at the time, but the re-recorded "Strange Little Girl" went on to be a top 10 hit.

Track listing

All songs written by Hugh Cornwell, Jean-Jacques Burnel, Dave Greenfield, Jet Black, except where noted.

Video 
A companion VHS video was released to accompany the album, containing promo clips for several of the band's songs. This was later released on DVD.

 "(Get A) Grip (On Yourself)"
 "Something Better Change"
 "Peaches" (live in Battersea Park, London, 16 September 1978)
 "Hanging Around" (live in Battersea Park, London, 16 September 1978)
 "Straighten Out"
 "5 Minutes"
 "No More Heroes"
 "Sweden (All Quiet on the Eastern Front)"
 "Nice 'n' Sleazy" (live in Battersea Park, London, 16 September 1978)
 "Duchess"
 "Nuclear Device (The Wizard of Aus)"
 "Bear Cage"
 "Who Wants The World?"
 "Golden Brown"
 "La Folie"
 "Strange Little Girl"

References

1982 compilation albums
The Stranglers compilation albums
1982 video albums
The Stranglers video albums
Music video compilation albums